Lights Out Hong Kong (香港熄燈 or 888熄燈) is a campaign in Hong Kong to protest against the city's light pollution.  Organisers of the campaign urged people in Hong Kong to switch off their lights for 3 minutes at 8pm on 8/8/2006 as a statement of protest.  Campaign organisers hope that the campaign will raise awareness for the issue of air pollution in Hong Kong and urge the government to take action against it.  The campaign has gained support from a number of green groups and corporations, and the music duo At17 has volunteered to promote it.

Participation
Despite the fact that few businesses actually turned off their lights at the suggested time, Lights Out Hong Kong organiser Alastair Robins claimed that the campaign was a success, as the goal was to raise public and government concerns about air pollution.  In particular, Chief Executive Donald Tsang refused to support the campaign with a delay of the nightly light show, Symphony of Lights, which started at 8 pm.  In a reply to the request made to delay the light show, Donald Tsang said that the campaign could "give adverse publicity to Hong Kong as an international metropolis and a major tourist attraction."

Supporters
Friends of the Earth (HK)
WWF Hong Kong
Greenpeace
Green Power
Green Student Council
Green Sense

Corporate supporters
Dairy Farm
Wellcome
PARKnSHOP
IKEA
Ricoh
7-Eleven
Fortress
Mannings
Watsons
Vanguard
KCR Corporation
MTR Corporation
Diners Professional Translation Services
Pacific Coffee Company
Saatchi and Saatchi
People Mountain People Sea
The Hyperfactory

See also

Action Blue Sky Campaign
Air pollution
Environmental organisation

References

External links
Google cached version of Lights Out Hong Kong official website
Lights Out Hong Kong article at World Business Council for Sustainable Development

Environmental organisations based in Hong Kong